The Sword Well or Guoxing Well is a historical water well in Dajia District, Taichung, Taiwan.

History
According to legend, the well was created from a sword stuck into the ground by Koxinga when he was stationed in the area because he asked God to provide water for his soldiers. The water then poured out from the southern slope of the mountain. The well was named Well of the Imperial Surname. In 1953, the local residents repaired the well and built brick wall around it. It was then renamed as the Sword Well.

Architecture
The well has a diameter of 0.5 meter and a depth of 2 meters.

See also
 List of tourist attractions in Taiwan

References

Buildings and structures in Taichung
Tourist attractions in Taichung
Water wells in Taiwan